Radovan Pavicevic (born 28 August 1995) is an Australian professional footballer who currently plays as a striker for Bonnyrigg White Eagles.

Career

Early life and career
Pavicevic is the son of Andrej Pavicevic, an Australian racing car driver. Radovan was also involved in racing Go-Karts, and still holds lap records as a rookie at Newcastle Kart Racing Club at Cameron Park.

Pavicevic attended, and played for Westfields Sports High School winning the 2010 Bill Turner Cup, as well as Marconi Stallions, before signing a youth contract with the Newcastle Jets youth team. In 2014 Pavicevic severely broke his arm during a Northern NSW NPL fixture against South Cardiff FC, having run into the perimeter fence surrounding the field during the game. The break in his arm required surgery to put a metal plate and 12 screws into his left humerus, and there were fears he could suffer permanent nerve damage as a result of the injury.

Newcastle Jets
Pavicevic made his senior debut for the Newcastle Jets off the bench in a 0–7 loss to Adelaide United at Coopers Stadium. His first goal would come shortly afterwards in a 2–1 defeat to Brisbane Roar. These early appearances would impress Jets manager Phil Stubbins enough, to earn him a two-year contract.

Pavicevic was released by the Jets in December 2016, having made 17 appearances for the side.

References

External links
 

Living people
1995 births
Australian soccer players
Association football forwards
Marconi Stallions FC players
Newcastle Jets FC players
A-League Men players
Australian people of Serbian descent